Shakey's Pizza is a pizza restaurant chain based in the United States. Founded in 1954, it was the first franchise pizza chain in the United States.  In 1968, the chain had 342 locations. The chain had about 500 stores globally, and 58 in the United States, as of July 2019. Currently, the stores can be found in the states of California and Washington, as well as in the Philippines, Singapore and Japan.

History

Shakey's Pizza was founded in Sacramento, California, on April 30, 1954, by Sherwood "Shakey" Johnson and Ed Plummer. Johnson's nickname resulted from nerve damage following a bout of malaria suffered during World War II. The parlor opened on a weekend, but since the pizza ovens were not yet completed only beer was served. Shakey took the profits from beer sales and bought ingredients for pizza the following Monday.

Shakey personally played Dixieland jazz piano to entertain patrons, also hiring the original members of the Silver Dollar Jazz Band, paying the musicians $10 each plus all the beer and pizza they wanted. (Shakey soon realized it was cheaper to pay the musicians scale). This brought the music of Lu Watters to the Sacramento area and caused a local sensation. Jazz historian K.O. Eckland has given this band the credit for the jazz revival in Sacramento that extended to the formation of the Sacramento Traditional Jazz Society. Shakey's also became known outside Sacramento, not for its pizza, but for the jazz program it sponsored on a regional radio network. Shakey Johnson is honored in the American Banjo Museum in Oklahoma City, Oklahoma, for his longtime use of banjo music at his pizza parlors. Other live music, including piano, was also a staple in the old Shakey's parlors. Up until the early 1970s printed menus included lyrics to classic barbershop songs so that the customers could sing along with the band while their meals were being prepared.

The original parlor (a remodeled grocery store) at 57th and J Streets in Sacramento remained in business until the mid-1990s.

The second Shakey's Pizza Parlor opened in Portland, Oregon, in 1956. Shakey's opened their third parlor in Albany, Oregon, in 1959, which was the first building Shakey's actually owned and the first building to be built in the distinct building style for which Shakey's is known.  It now operates as a used bookstore. According to Johnson, Shakey's Pizza engaged in little market research and made most of its decisions on where to locate stores by going where Kinney Shoes opened stores. By the time Johnson sold his interest in 1967, there were 272 Shakey's Pizza Parlors in the United States. The first international store opened in Winnipeg, Manitoba, Canada, in 1968. By 1975, the company had expanded to the Pacific Rim, including Japan and the Philippines.

By the early 1970s, Shakey's had become popular with families and youth sports groups in Southern California. The long rows of picnic tables end-on-end facilitated large groups. Youth sports teams would go to Shakey's after their weekend games, where the kids could eat pizza and have fun, and the parents could drink beer and socialize. In fact, the advertising motto for Shakey's was "We serve fun at Shakey's... also pizza". One of the features of Shakey's was its large windows between the dining hall and the kitchen. One could order pizza and then watch as the dough was prepared, sauce and toppings added, and then pizza slid into the oven. Kids enjoyed watching the process and running to tell their parents when the pizza came out of the oven.

Philippines

The brand became a well-established franchise in the Philippines, where it began in 1975 under the ownership of the country's largest food conglomerate, San Miguel Corporation, primarily promoting their San Miguel draft beer.  Beginning with a restaurant located in Makati Avenue, Makati, the restaurant expanded rapidly in Metro Manila, with most of its outlets offering live music.  San Miguel had difficulty maintaining the consistency of the branches, and ultimately sold the franchise in 1987 to International Family Food Services, Inc. (IFFSI), a group led by the family of sports executive Leo Prieto.  By 1997, it had evolved into mostly a fast-food franchise.  In 2003, the company began "reengineering" the brand as a family-oriented casual dining brand.  In 2004, Shakey's partnered with Sports Vision for the launch of the Shakey's V-League, one of the pioneering volleyball leagues in the country.

As of early 2015, there were 153 Shakey's outlets in the Philippines, more than double the number remaining in the United States.

In March 2016, the Century Pacific Group and the Singapore-based GIC Private Limited acquired the majority shares of IFFSI from the Prieto family, which will retain a minority interest in the company. In October 2016, IFFSI changed its name to Shakey's Pizza Asia Ventures Inc. (SPAVI) and became listed in the Philippine Stock Exchange on December 15, 2016 with the ticker symbol . It was disclosed that IFFSI acquired ownership of the Shakey's trademark in the Philippines since 1999 and also owns the trademark rights for the Middle East, Asia (except Japan and Malaysia), China, India, Australia and New Zealand. Circa 2017 it signed a joint venture deal to bring the brand to Kuwait.

SPAVI has garnered several recognitions over time. The company ranked in Financial Times’ feature on Asia-Pacific’s 500 high-growth companies in 2020 and 2021.  It was also hailed as the “Philippines’ Best Small Cap Company” by Finance Asia in 2018.

Aside from Shakey's, SPAVI has also acquired more food brands. In 2019, SPAVI acquired Peri-Peri Charcoal Chicken and Project Pie. In 2020, SPAVI entered into a master franchise agreement with Koufu Group Ltd. to bring R&B, a Singapore-based milk tea brand, to the Philippines. It opened R&B's first Philippine branch along Retiro Street in Quezon City in November 2021. In 2021, SPAVI acquired Potato Corner and later in 2022, PC International Pte. Ltd., a company that owns and operates the food kiosk brand in Singapore.

The Shakey's Super League was formally launched on August 16, 2022, at the Shakey's Pizza ASEANA outlet in Parañaque City.  This marks the return of Shakey's Pizza in Philippine volleyball since they served as the title sponsor for the Shakey's V-League (now Premier Volleyball League) from 2004 to 2017.

Ownership changes and decline
Shakey Johnson sold his half of the company for $3 million to Colorado Milling and Elevator in 1967, which acquired Plummer's half for $9 million the next year when Colorado Milling merged with Great Western Sugar Company to become Great Western United Corporation.

In 1974, Shakey's was sold from Great Western to Hunt International Resources, famous for their attempt to corner the silver market. At the time Hunt International bought Shakey's in 1974, the restaurant chain had approximately 500 stores throughout the United States, including stores as far east as Latham, New York  and Westbrook, Maine.

Two franchisees bought the chain in 1984 and they sold out to Inno-Pacific Holdings of Singapore in 1989.  By that time, the number of franchises had declined to 221.  Most of the remaining U. S. stores closed during the time Inno-Pacific owned the chain. Some of the remaining franchisees took Inno-Pacific to court in 2003. Before the case could come to trial, Shakey's was sold to Jacmar Companies of Alhambra, California in 2004. Jacmar had been the franchisee of 19 Shakey's restaurants.

, there were 51 Shakey's Pizza restaurants in the United States - 48 of the locations are in California (all, except Oroville, are in Southern California), and two in Washington. The last location east of the Mississippi River, in Auburn, Alabama, closed in April 2019.

There are six locations in the Greater Mexico City metro area.

All locations closed their dining rooms in mid-March 2020 to combat the COVID-19 pandemic, with take-out service still available. Dining rooms re-opened in May 2021.

In popular culture

 At the start of Wayne's World, Rob Lowe's character is introduced to the show by a Shakey's employee.
 In a season five episode of South Park titled "Kenny Dies", Cartman uses human stem cells to clone a Shakey's restaurant. Cartman recalled this act of his in the season 9 episode "The Death of Eric Cartman". Shakey's was also briefly mentioned in other episodes such as the season 6 episode "Asspen", the season 8 episode "Up the Down Steroid", and the season 10 episode "Stanley's Cup".
 In episode seven of the National Public Radio series Riders Radio Theater, a flashback sequence features the character Deputy Doug saying "I'm not going to be a banjo player at Shakey's the rest of my life!"
 In the film Love & Pop, two characters meet at a Shakey's in Japan.

Gallery

See also
 List of pizza chains of the United States

References

External links

 Shakey's USA

Restaurants established in 1954
Pizza chains of the United States
Pizza franchises
Companies based in Los Angeles County, California
Restaurants in California
Restaurant chains in the United States
Alhambra, California
1954 establishments in California